I'm a Soldier Mom is a 1966 Soviet drama film directed by .

Plot 
A young, stubborn and undisciplined man goes to serve in the army, where he will understand the need for military service...

Cast 
 Vladimir Grammatikov
 Anatoli Ilin
 Vladimir Serababin as Voloshin (as Vlandimir Serobabin)
 Sergey Shakurov as Peganov
 Valentin Zubkov

References

External links 
 

1966 films
1960s Russian-language films
Soviet drama films
1966 drama films